Bettina (minor planet designation: 250 Bettina) is a large main belt asteroid that was discovered by Austrian astronomer Johann Palisa on September 3, 1885, in Vienna. It was named in honour of Baroness Bettina von Rothschild (née de Rothschild; 1858–1892), wife of Baron Albert von Rothschild who had bought the naming rights for £50. Based upon the spectrum, it is classified as an M-type asteroid.

In 1988, the asteroid was observed from the Collurania-Teramo Observatory, allowing a light curve to be produced that showed "an irregular behavior with a deeper minimum and a narrower maximum". The data showed a rotation period of 5.055 hours and a brightness variation of 0.17 ± 0.01 in magnitude. The ratio of the lengths of the major to minor axes for this asteroid were found to be 1.51 ± 0.03.

References

External links
 The Asteroid Orbital Elements Database
 Minor Planet Discovery Circumstances
 Asteroid Lightcurve Data File
 
 

Background asteroids
Bettina
Bettina
M-type asteroids (Tholen)
Xk-type asteroids (SMASS)
18850903